From 2005 to 2012, Japan discussed the possibility of changing the laws of succession to the Chrysanthemum Throne, which is currently limited to males of the Japanese Imperial Family.

As of 2021, there are three people in the line of succession to the current Emperor Naruhito: Crown Prince Akishino, Prince Hisahito, and Prince Hitachi. Prior to the birth of Prince Hisahito in 2006, the government of Japan considered changes to the Imperial Household Law to allow additional potential successors to the throne.

Background 

Traditionally, the imperial throne was passed on under custom which resembled the rule of agnatic seniority. Theoretically, any male or female with patrilineal lineage to early Japanese monarchs, who descended in direct male line from the first emperor, Jimmu, could come to hold the throne. In practice, preference was given to first-born male offspring of a preceding male monarch, followed by his brothers, sons, other males of the immediate male-line family, and ultimately male members of the Shinnōke houses, cadet branches distantly related to the reigning monarch. Because there existed no restrictions on remarriage or polygyny in historical Japan, there existed usually many male relatives who could take over the throne.

However, there have been several instances of a woman serving as a reigning Empress of Japan. All reigning empresses were descendants of the Imperial Dynasty in the male line. Such successions have happened for a variety of reasons. On some occasions, the direct male heir was only a toddler and unable to perform the imperial rituals. In such an instance, his mother, aunt or elder sister, if also of Imperial lineage through her patriline, temporarily took over the throne until the child came to puberty, which was deemed sufficient for a boy's accession. An empress' offspring also did not have claim to the throne from the said maternal lineage, because all historical reigning empresses were either empresses consort or crown prince spouse before their enthronement, or unmarried through their lives, so assigning a female to the throne had the convenient effect of postponing succession disputes. The last time Japan had a reigning empress was in 1771, when Empress Go-Sakuramachi abdicated in favor of her nephew, Emperor Go-Momozono.

After the Meiji Restoration, Japan imported the Prussian model of imperial succession, in which princesses were explicitly excluded from succession. The Japanese government also banned polygyny, which was previously allowed to any family with noble rank (samurai or kuge) particularly if the first wife could not produce male offspring. The Imperial Household Law of 1947, enacted under Japan's post-war constitution after World War II, a further restriction was instituted: only the descendants of the male line of Emperor Taishō (the father of then-emperor Hirohito) could be part of the official imperial family and have a claim to succession, excluding all other male lines of the imperial dynasty and specifically barring the emperor and other members of the imperial family from adopting children.

Under Chapter 1: Article 1 of the Imperial Household Law, "The Imperial Throne shall be succeeded to by a male offspring in the male line belonging to the Imperial Lineage". The line of succession is detailed in Article 2 as:

 The eldest son of the Emperor 
 The eldest son of the Emperor's eldest son 
 Other descendants of the eldest son of the Emperor 
 The second son of the Emperor and his descendants 
 Other descendants of the Emperor 
 Brothers of the Emperor and their descendants 
 Uncles of the Emperor and their descendants

Situation 

The Japanese imperial dynasty, descended from the Emperor Jimmu, is perhaps the oldest patrilineage in the world, and members of that single dynasty have ruled Japan for nearly 2700 years. The ancient Japanese system is of agnatic succession, generally by primogeniture, with the caveat that, in case the imperial family lacked heirs, they may adopt a boy from collateral cadet branches of the Imperial lineage. Four such cadet branches of the imperial family had, from ancient times, held the privilege of supplying an heir in adoption to the throne of Japan. The need for adoption rarely arose, because Emperors normally had several consorts, and the sons of all consorts were equally eligible to succeed.

All of these traditions and solutions had been discontinued or prohibited by the 1950s. Emperor Shōwa (Hirohito) was the Emperor of the Japanese Empire during World War II. After the war ended, a new constitution was drawn up for Japan which, among other things, limited the succession to agnatic descendants of Emperor Shōwa's father, the Emperor Taishō, thus excluding cadet branches of the Imperial family. It also prohibited the ancient and well-accepted Imperial Japanese practise of adoption. Since the days of the Emperor Meiji, the practise of having several consorts had been discontinued. The imperial family, therefore, became very small after the new constitution of Japan was adopted in 1947.

By the turn of the century, these restrictions imposed by the Allies had resulted in a situation where the dynasty came perilously close to extinction. Emperor Emeritus Akihito (eldest son of Emperor Shōwa) had only two sons: Emperor Naruhito and Fumihito, Crown Prince. The younger son, Prince Fumihito, was the first to marry, and he soon became the father of two daughters, Princess Mako (b. 1991) and Princess Kako (b. 1994), but he had no son until 6 September 2006, when his wife gave birth to Prince Hisahito. Akihito's eldest son, Naruhito, who married in 1993, did not become a father until 1 December 2001, when his wife gave birth to a daughter, the Princess Aiko. Naruhito and his wife received their child with great joy, since they had almost despaired of parenthood. However, the birth of the princess opened the question of the succession to public debate, because Naruhito's wife, who had suffered a miscarriage previously, and was very close to forty years of age, was unlikely to bear further children.

Akihito's brother, Masahito, Prince Hitachi has no children at all.

The two other collateral members of the Imperial Family also had only daughters: the late Prince Tomohito of Mikasa had two daughters, Princess Akiko (b. 1981) and Princess Yōko (b. 1983); the late Norihito, Prince Takamado had three daughters, Princess Tsuguko (b. 1986), Princess Noriko (b. 1988) and Princess Ayako (b. 1990). Prior to the birth of Prince Hisahito in 2006, no male heir had been born into the Imperial Family in nearly 41 years.

Male members of the imperial family

Order of succession

Debate
In the early 2000s, the succession controversy emerged as a political issue. The Asahi Shimbun published an editorial in May 2006 suggesting that the current system was unsustainable. In an Asahi Shimbun survey in March 2006, 82% of the respondents supported the revision of the Imperial Household Law to allow a woman to ascend to the Imperial Throne. Then Prime Minister Junichirō Koizumi also strongly supported the revision, pledging to present a bill to the 2006 session of the parliament.

Some conservative lawmakers opposed Koizumi and said the debate was premature. The current emperor's cousin, Prince Tomohito of Mikasa, also opposed the proposal, saying that the official male members of the Japanese imperial family might take up concubines in order to produce male members because it was previously possible for a male illegitimate child to assume the imperial throne. Later he said that this remark was just a joke. Another solution would be to restore the Shinnoke (agnatic collateral branches of the imperial dynasty which had been disinherited by the United States) to the line of succession.

Prince Akishino's wife, Princess Kiko, gave birth to a baby boy on September 6, 2006. The child, Prince Hisahito, is now second in line to the imperial throne. Following the birth of Prince Hisahito, the political debate surrounding succession subsided. Koizumi withdrew his bill, though public opinion polling suggested that support for the change was still around 68%.

Controversy exists as to what extent the current rule of succession under the Imperial Household Law should be changed. Those on the Right advocate a change, holding the Prussian-style agnatic primogeniture, but bringing back the previously excluded male relatives into the Imperial household. Liberals advocate the adoption of absolute primogeniture. Moderates advocate re-adoption of earlier, indigenous customs of succession, that is, that a female can succeed to the throne as long as she holds precedence in seniority or proximity within the patrilineal kinship. Princess Takamatsu, the last surviving Arisugawa-Takamatsu and aunt to Emperor Akihito, advocated the traditional, customary rights of female princesses to succession, in her media interviews and articles, after the birth of Princess Aiko.

Adoption of absolute primogeniture would permit, as has happened in history, unmarried or widowed female descendants in the male line of the Imperial House to inherit the Chrysanthemum Throne, but would also allow something unprecedented: it would allow married princesses and princesses' children whose fathers are not descendants in the male line of the earlier emperors, to ascend the throne. This scenario could be interpreted as meaning a new dynasty would take over the Chrysanthemum Throne, since dynasties are traditionally defined patrilineally.

The Abe government had indicated that it would begin discussions about the status of women in the imperial family soon after Naruhito ascends the throne. "I don’t think this would be their preference," stated academic historian in Imperial Japan Kenneth Ruoff, "But they don’t have any choice. They are facing extinction of the imperial line."

Timeline

2005 
On January 24, 2005, the Japanese government announced that it would consider allowing the Crown Prince and Princess to adopt a male child, in order to avoid a possible "heir crisis". Adoption from other male-line branches of the Imperial Line is an age-old imperial Japanese tradition for dynastic purposes, prohibited only in modern times by Western influence. The child would presumably be adopted from one of the former imperial branches which lost imperial status after World War II.  A government-appointed panel of experts submitted a report on October 25, 2005, recommending that the imperial succession law be amended to permit equal primogeniture.
 In November 2005, it was reported that Emperor Akihito's cousin Prince Tomohito of Mikasa had objected to the reversal of the male-only succession, in a column of the magazine of the welfare association which he serves as president. Prince Tomohito had suggested four options to continue the male-only line succession there; the fourth was permitting the Emperor or Crown Prince to take a concubine, which was allowed by the former law of imperial succession.

2006 
On January 20, 2006, Prime Minister Junichirō Koizumi used part of his annual keynote speech to address the controversy when he pledged to submit a bill to the Japanese Diet letting women ascend to the throne so that imperial succession may be continued into the future in a stable manner. Koizumi did not announce any particular timing for the legislation to be introduced, nor did he provide details about its content, but said that it would be in line with the conclusions of the 2005 government panel.
 On February 1, 2006, former trade minister Takeo Hiranuma caused a controversy by arguing against the proposed reform bill because Princess Aiko might marry a foreigner in the future.
 On February 6, 2006, it was announced that Prince Akishino's wife Princess Kiko was pregnant, and would give birth due September.
 On September 6, 2006, Princess Kiko delivered a baby boy, later named Prince Hisahito. According to the current succession law he is second in line to the throne, but Princess Aiko, who now holds no right to succession, would have precedence over him as well as over her uncle if the law is changed.

2007 
On January 3, 2007, Prime Minister Shinzō Abe announced that he would drop the proposal to alter the Imperial Household Act.
 In September 2007, Abe's successor Yasuo Fukuda stated he was in favour of reforming the Imperial Household Law to allow female succession.

2009 
 In November 2009, in a speech commemorating his 20th anniversary since ascending the Chrysanthemum Throne, Emperor Akihito refrained from giving his own suggestions on the succession debate, but urged the government to consider the opinions of his sons Crown Prince Naruhito and Prince Akishino.

2011 
 On October 5, 2011, Shingo Haketa, Grand Steward of the Imperial Household Agency, visited Prime Minister Yoshihiko Noda at his office and told him that it was a matter of urgency to enable female members of the imperial family to create family branches. According to the Grand Steward, the imperial family cannot maintain its activities in a stable manner. Twelve imperial family members were adults under the age of 60 but half of these were unmarried princesses between the ages of 20 and 30. As the princesses leave the family through marriage, it would become more and more difficult for the imperial family to perform its duties. Considering that Prince Hisahito was the only grandchild of Emperor Akihito eligible to assume the throne, the agency also said that it would be necessary to design a system to ensure stable succession to the imperial throne, although this would be a mid- to long-term concern. Grand Steward Haketa has reportedly been worried about the succession issue when he took the top post at the agency in 2005. After the Democratic Party of Japan won the election in September 2009, he explained the situation to Cabinet members, urging the government to address the issue. The government has yet to act upon his request.
 On November 25, 2011, Chief Cabinet Secretary Osamu Fujimura said that a way had to be found to secure a "stable" accession to the Chrysanthemum Throne, expressing concern over the small number of successors to the crown. "The government is aware that future anxiety over securing a stable succession has not been resolved," Fujimura said. "Maintaining a steady succession is an issue that relates to the core of the nation and the government will consider it based on thorough discussions from various levels of the public." The next day, former trade minister Takeo Hiranuma, now a founding member of Sunrise Party of Japan, contended during a meeting with conservative organizations that the male line of imperial heirs should be maintained. Hiranuma suggested that if female members were allowed to remain in the family after marrying a commoner, they should try and marry a member of the eleven branches of the imperial family that were removed from the line of succession in October 1947. Hiranuma also proposed to reinstate the former branches in the Imperial family, to increase its size.
 On December 1, 2011, Prime Minister Noda called for a national debate on whether women should be allowed to retain their imperial status after marriage. He did not set any deadlines but declared his intention to build a framework to discuss the issue. Two days later, some government officials told Kyodo News that the issue of the female members' status "does not appear to be a pressing task. The government has no energy left to spare for that." According to Kyodo, a source close to the imperial family expressed concern because of the government's hesitant attitude. "It's obvious that the imperial family's range of activities will become narrower in the future without reforming the current system. A new system needs to be created before Princess Mako gets married. I'd like to see the public take more interest in the matter," said the source.

2012 
 On January 6, 2012, Chief Cabinet Secretary Fujimura told a press conference that the government recognized "that maintaining the stability of the activities of the Imperial Household and lessening the burden of official duties placed on Their Majesties the Emperor and Empress are major issues of a high degree of urgency." He announced that they would focus on discussing the status of female members and the possibility for them to create new family branches but that there would be no debate about giving succession rights to them or to their children. He announced that "in order to contribute to the discussion," expert hearings would take place once or twice every month. Former Supreme Court Justice and lawyer Itsuo Sonobe was appointed to the position of Special Advisor to the Cabinet to lead the hearings, "as he is highly knowledgeable about the Imperial Household system" and formerly served as deputy chairman of the  that recommended in 2005 that the right to ascend the Chrysanthemum Throne should be expanded to women and imperial family offspring of female lineage.
 On January 7 and 8, 2012, a Kyodo News poll showed that 65.5% of the Japanese people supported the idea of allowing female members of the imperial family to create their own branches of the family and to retain their imperial status after marriage. The telephone survey drew valid responses from 1,016 eligible voters in 1,459 households randomly dialed across Japan, apart from parts of Fukushima Prefecture evacuated by the nuclear crisis.
 On February 10, 2012, a Japan Times editorial accused Fujimura of "beating around the bush" by solely talking about the importance of maintaining "the activities of the Imperial Family in a stable manner" and of lightening "the burden of the Emperor and Empress's official duties." It voiced concerns that "if male members of the Imperial Family become very few, it will become difficult to keep the Imperial line" and that "given the current situation of the Imperial Family, making a woman Imperial Family member serve as an emperor may become unavoidable," blaming the government for "shying away from discussing a possible situation in which there will be no males to succeed to the throne." Colin Jones, a law professor at Doshisha University in Kyoto, warned that, without changes, there would not be a backup plan if Prince Hisahito should fail to have a son or be incapacitated in some way. "Monarchies have extended families just so that there's a source of spares," Professor Jones said. "Over time there will be no other members of the imperial family to act as proxies." According to Jones, it is necessary to also address the succession issue as soon as possible, since it may be too late to do so by the time Hisahito becomes emperor. "They can't just suddenly conjure up new imperials," he said. "They've got to do something now."
 On February 29, 2012, the first hearing took place. On this occasion Dr. Akira Imatani, Professor of medieval Japanese history at Teikyo University, and Soichiro Tawara, a journalist, gave their opinions. Both recommended that female members of the imperial family should retain their status after marriage. "Times have changed and Japan has become a society that promotes gender equality. I think refusing to allow females to maintain their status is an anachronism," Tahara told the government panel. Tahara and Imatani proposed that commoner husbands of imperial princesses be granted quasi-imperial status, which would permit them to attend official events while keeping their jobs, if even with some restrictions.
 On March 29, 2012, the second hearing took place. Dr. Masayuki Yamauchi, professor of international affairs at the Graduate School of The University of Tokyo, and Dr. Makoto Oishi, professor of constitutional law at the Graduate School of Kyoto University, also expressed their endorsement of princesses establishing their own branches. Yamauchi proposed, in order to reduce the burden on the public budget, to limit the eligibility to princesses within the second degree of kinship to the emperor. (that group included the three granddaughters of Emperor Akihito, Princesses Aiko, Mako and Kako.) According to Yamauchi, at some point in the future the imperial family may consist of a single nuclear family, that of Prince Hisahito, and support by female-headed family branches might prove helpful in avoiding such isolation.
 On April 10, 2012, the third hearing took place. The experts at this hearing were Yoshiko Sakurai and Professor Akira Momochi, and these two were the first to clearly oppose the idea of letting imperial women retain their royal status upon marriage. Professor Momochi teaches law at Nihon University, Japan's largest university. Ms. Sakurai is a well-known journalist and social critic in Japan, especially famous for her right-wing and sometimes ultra-nationalistic stance. Although there are no plans to give the princesses succession rights, Ms. Sakurai and Professor Momochi still have concerns that female-headed imperial family branches could eventually break the paternal lineage. As a solution to the decrease of imperial family members and the lack of eligible male heirs, they suggested revising the Imperial Household Law so that male descendants of former imperial families which renounced their royal status in 1947 be allowed to return to the imperial family as adoptees. Ms. Sakurai also proposed reinstating four of the former imperial branches. "There were too many, so they were cut back. Now we're in the complete opposite position, why can't we take the opposite measure?" she asked. The background to this statement is that up until the Meiji Restoration there were only four collateral branches of the imperial family, the shinnōke. In the 19th century, more houses were created from branches of the Fushimi-no-miya house, the ōke. By 1935, there were eleven collateral branches of the imperial family altogether, in addition to the families of Emperor Showa's three brothers. According to the Yomiuri Shimbun, the government is against the idea of reinstating the former collateral branches, "saying it will be difficult to obtain public support as the descendants were born as commoners."
 On April 23, 2012, the fourth hearing took place. The experts at this hearing also backed the establishment of female branches of the imperial family. As the government plans to hear the views of "just under 20 experts," it is assumed that the hearings are halfway finished.
 On May 4, 2012, the Yomiuri Shimbun reported that the government plans to consult the ruling Democratic Party of Japan and major opposition parties on a draft for the revision of the Imperial Household Act before submitting a bill to an extraordinary Diet session in autumn or to an ordinary sitting of the legislature next year. Looking back at the hearings, one government official said, "A wider than expected range of views have been expressed," talking about the proposal to expand the number of imperial family members by allowing men of the former princely houses to return to the imperial family as adoptees. Another idea that raised attention was allowing female imperial family members to retain the title of "princess" even after leaving the imperial family by marriage, so they could still take part in the royal family's activities despite losing the formal imperial family member status. As this idea has been supported by proponents and opponents of the creation of female-headed family branches, officials said that it could be a compromise if the discussion "remains inconclusive." As there are still controversial viewpoints concerning the possibility of allowing princesses to keep their royal status after marriage, "the leadership of Prime Minister Yoshihiko Noda will be crucial to government reform of the system," government officials told the Yomiuri Shimbun. However, although Prime Minister Noda once underlined the urgency of the matter, he has not made any public remarks on this issue for many months. This has led to skepticism among some government officials about whether the issue is a major priority for him. A senior official of the Imperial Household Agency voiced his concern, telling the Yomiuri Shimbun, "When considering the near future, the system needs to change." According to the Imperial Household Law, the Empress as well as princesses are temporarily allowed to act on behalf of the emperor in state matters. That means that if female members of the imperial family were allowed to keep their royal status after marriage, they would be able to considerably alleviate the burden of the few male royals by taking over some of their duties.

2014 
 On May 27, 2014, Princess Noriko of Takamado announced her engagement to commoner Kunimaro Senge. After her marriage on 5 October 2014, she left the imperial family.

2016 
 On October 27, 2016, Prince Mikasa, one of the only five family members eligible to inherit the throne, died at age 100. In the previous 15 years only two children were born into the Imperial family while seven members left through death or marriage thereby reducing their number to 19.

2017 
 On June 8, 2017, the Japanese parliament passed legislation that would allow Emperor Akihito to abdicate. If enacted the abdication would likely occur in December 2018 when he reaches age 85.  The legislation also includes a provision that asks parliament to consider allowing female royals to remain in the Imperial Family after their marriage.  The legislation however did not address female succession, nor would the provision to abdicate apply to any successive Emperor.
 In September 2017, the Imperial Household Agency officially announced the engagement of Princess Mako. The Agency later announced that the couple decided to postpone their marriage until at least 2020. Under the current system she would leave the Imperial Family and her name will change from Her Imperial Highness Princess Mako of Akishino to Mrs. Kei Komuro after her marriage.
 On December 1, 2017, it was announced that Emperor Akihito will officially abdicate at midnight local time on April 30, 2019. Crown Prince Naruhito succeed him on May 1, 2019, beginning the Reiwa Imperial Era.

2018 

 On August 12, 2018, Princess Ayako of Takamado announced her engagement to commoner Kei Moriya. After her marriage on October 29, 2018, she left the imperial family.

2019 
 In January 2019, the Japanese government announced that only male Imperial Family members would be allowed to participate at the key accession ceremony where Naruhito will receive the sacred regalia.  Japan's sole female cabinet minister Satsuki Katayama was allowed to attend as government ministers are considered observers rather than participants.
In April 2019, the Japanese Government announced that it would only start internal discussions on the succession crisis after May 1. Nevertheless, Professor of Japanese History, Yuji Otabe from the Shizuoka University of Welfare has criticized politicians for dodging the issue by saying that "they do not want to shoulder the responsibility" of having to deal with female succession.
In July 2019, the government planned to set up a panel by year-end to discuss how to achieve a stable imperial succession, including whether to allow female succession. Nevertheless, the panel, consisting of intellectuals from various fields, will not discuss changing the current order of succession. At that point in time the Conservative members of Prime Minister Shinzō Abe's Liberal Democratic Party were opposed to having an empress on the throne, who could open up the line of succession to female members.

2020 
 In January 2020, it was reported that Deputy Chief Cabinet Secretary Kazuhiro Sugita would form an expert panel and begin debates on female succession, restoration of Imperial Family branches removed after WWII, and female retention of royal status after marriage. The debates were scheduled to begin after the Rikkoshi no Rei ceremony on April 19 when Crown Prince Akishino was to formally proclaim that he is first in line to the throne.  The ceremony and the debates were postponed due to the COVID-19 pandemic in Japan.
 In August 2020, then Defense Minister Tarō Kōno defended in an online program that matrilineal emperors, whose fathers have no bloodline connection with past emperors, should be considered to maintain stable succession of the Imperial Throne. He further proposed that it should be "possible that Imperial princesses (children or grandchildren of an emperor), including Princess Aiko (the daughter of Emperor Naruhito), could be accepted as the next empress. The Defense Minister also argued that under the current succession rules it would be difficult to allure any potential bride for the male heir, who would face enormous psychological pressure to become pregnant with a boy. Kono also questioned a proposal suggested by some conservative members of the Liberal Democratic Party and others to reinstate members of former Imperial branch households to maintain patrilineal lineage succession, saying, "There will be a need to have discussions whether the people of Japan will truly accept reinstating those who were separated from the Imperial Family some 600 years ago."
 On November 8, 2020 the postponed Rikkoshi no Rei ceremony took place and Crown Prince Akishino was formally proclaimed as Emperor Naruhito's successor on Sunday. Prime Minister Yoshihide Suga was reported to state that the government will investigate measures to ensure stable succession but unnamed government officials wanted to shelve any decision as "premature". Public opinion on changes to imperial succession is divided with one source stating, "A decision cannot be made until we see whether Prince Hisahito will have a male child."
 On November 24, 2020, a proposal was raised to establish the courtesy title Kojo ("Imperial Woman" in English) for female members who leave the family after they marry commoners. Such a system would not require changes to Imperial Household Law but would give former princesses an official status in order to conduct public duties. Tokyo is also considering an idea to establish families headed by female members of the Imperial family by retaining their status after marriage and permit male descendants of former Imperial family members to enter the household by adoption. On November 26, Yuichiro Tamaki, leader of the Democratic Party for the People and Kazuo Shii, chairman of the Communist Party, criticized the proposal due to its lack of addressing stable succession and any legality to recognize a female Emperor.

2021
 On March 23, 2021, a panel was created to look into securing a stable line of succession in the Imperial Family with 20 experts being called to testify on their views. On July 27, 2021, the panel announced that the current line of succession to Crown Prince Akishino, then to Prince Hisahito, must remain unchanged. Discussion of lineage beyond Hisahito's reign should be postponed. The panel plans to continue discussion on proposals to allow women to remain in the Imperial Family after marriage to commoners, and on allowing male members of former Imperial branches to be adopted into the Imperial Family.
 In September 2021, it was considered to amend the Imperial Household Law and allow the 85-year old Prince Hitachi to adopt a male member of the collateral branches of the imperial family.
 On October 26, 2021, Princess Mako of Akishino married her fiancé and left the imperial family.
 On November 30, 2021, Crown Prince Fumihito criticized those who were critical of his daughter's marriage to Kei Komuro and that the family should be allowed the opportunity to refute false allegations made by the media.
 On December 22, 2021, the panel has recommended that the succession of the throne be kept to male heirs. The panel said that options such as adopting single men and allowing female royals to keep their imperial status would require revising the 1947 Imperial Household Law.

2022
 On January 12, 2022, Prime Minister Fumio Kishida delivered the imperial succession report prepared by a government commission of experts to Lower House Speaker Hiroyuki Hosoda and Upper House President Akiko Santo. The report effectively set aside the question of how to maintain the imperial succession after Prince Hisahito, stating that the discussion on the matter is "still premature". The report also did not discuss whether to allow a daughter of the emperor or a son of the female line of the imperial family to take the throne. Thus, the report did not explore the question of how Japan can keep the imperial succession stable in the future. After the delivery of the report, the political parties were divided on the succession, with differing opinions.
 On January 13, 2022, the editorial board of Asahi Shimbun Newspapers said that the imperial succession report "is unlikely to gain support from the public" and that "it is rather unlikely that the report will gain widespread support among Japanese people, today and in the future". Furthermore, the Newspapers states that "the imperial system in a democratic society can only continue to exist if it is supported by a wide range of audiences. With the diversity of values ​​among Japanese people expected to grow further in the coming years, it is questionable whether the proposals put forward by the group would ensure long-term stability in the activities and succession of the Imperial family".
 On January 19, 2022, the Japanese government met to address the decline in the number of members of the Imperial family. The Liberal Democratic Party has said it will address the issue of decreasing members of the Imperial family.
 On March 24, 2022, a group of experts, under pressure from the Liberal Democratic Party, met to discuss the status of imperial princesses after marriage: they all agreed to keep the titles, treatment, residence in the palace and patronages to married princesses. In this way the princesses will still be able to take part in the activities of the imperial family. The group of experts, however, also agreed not to confer titles and treatments on the husbands and children of princesses.
 On June 28, 2022, Hiroaki Fushimi, a former member of the imperial family of the Fushimi-no-miya branch, said he was cautious about a possible return to the imperial family of the former collateral branches. But he said that he and his family "would have no choice but to follow if the emperor, as well as the government, tells us to return to the imperial family".
 On September 12, 2022, the editorial board of Mainichi Shimbun Newspapers described the government's procastination on the succession issue as "irresponsible", as  "..without taking any action, the number of Imperial Family members will only keep falling."

2023 
 On February 26, 2023, Prime Minister Fumio Kishida said that the Diet would discuss a stable succession to the throne, as an issue that can no longer be postponed. Liberal Democratic Party members were confused by the Prime Minister's unexpected stance but they said they would address the issue.

References

External links 
 
 
 Official Advisory Report

Japanese monarchy
Political controversies in Japan
Succession